"Rock Baby Rock" is a song by the Filipino disco group VST & Company written by Vic Sotto. It was one of the songs on the part of the album called "VST Concerto in A Minor". It was one of the group's biggest hits. Produced by the band themselves. Sotto said in an interview with PTV's Xiao Time segment that it was his most favorite VST song because he put a lot of effort on it. 

The film of the same name was named after this song, starring Vilma Santos, Rolly Quizon, Tito Sotto, Vic Sotto, Joey de Leon and VST & Company themselves. 

During Eat Bulaga!'''s show in Toronto, Canada on 12 April 2014, Joey de Leon performed the song until the rest of the hosts on the show joined him including Tito and Vic Sotto. It was also performed by the reunited VST & Co. (except Val and Vic Sotto) during  a tribute to Snaffu Rigor on August 8, 2016.

Cover versions
 It was performed by Rey Valera, Aegis and Jaya and Kyla on SiS as a part of their VST medley along with "Awitin Mo At Isasayaw Ko" and "Magsayawan".
Kala covered this song for the album The Best of Manila Sound: Hopia Mani Popcorn.
Enrique Gil covered a medley of "Rock Baby Rock" along with "Magsayawan" on his debut album, King of the Gil''.

References

1978 songs
Songs written by Vic Sotto
VST & Co. songs
Tagalog-language songs